Harold Mathias (1864 – 8 April 1954) was a New Zealand cricketer. He played in two first-class matches for Canterbury from 1883 to 1887.

See also
 List of Canterbury representative cricketers

References

External links
 

1864 births
1954 deaths
New Zealand cricketers
Canterbury cricketers
Cricketers from Christchurch